Elisso Bolkvadze or Eliso Bolkvadze is a Georgian classical pianist born in Tbilisi, Georgia. She is member of Parliament of Georgia since 11 December 2020.

Early life 

Elisso Bolkvadze comes from a literary family. She gave her first concert at the age of seven. She studied in a special music school for gifted children in Tbilisi, and continued her study in the conservatory of Tbilisi with professor Tengiz Amirejibi, and at the same time she followed a master class with Professor Tatiana Nikolayeva in Moscow. Later she moved in Paris and continued her musical and intellectual education with the composer and philosopher Michel Sogny in France and Austria.

Career

Awards and recognitions
Elisso Bolkvadze has won some prizes at international piano competitions, such as 6th prize at Van Cliburn International Piano Competition in United States (1989), second prize at Vianna da Motta International Music Competition in Lisbon (1987), best interpretation of french music at Long-Thibaud-Crespin Competition in Paris  France, 1995), 3th prize at Axa International Piano Competition in Dublin (1997), etc.

On October 7, 2015, she was awarded the Order of Arts and Literature, by France's Culture Minister Fleur Pellerin.

January 22, 2015, she became UNESCO Artist for Peace. This prestigious title was designated to her by UNESCO General Director, Irina Bokova.

In 2018, she was also awarded the most prestigious national honor - “The medal of honor of Georgian government” by the Georgian government.

Elisso Bolkvadze was interviewed by the Piano Performer Magazine (USA) and was featured on the cover of the fall issue.

Concerts
Elisso has played sold out recitals and concerts throughout Europe, United States, Japan and China in prestigious Concert Halls: such as John F. Kennedy Center for the Performing Arts (Washington) Pasadena Auditorium (Los Angeles), Orange County Convention Center, Salle Pleyel, Salle Gaveau, Théâtre des Champs Elysées in Paris, Gewandhaus Orchestra (Leipzig), Herkulessaal (Munich, Germany) Alte Oper (Frankfurt, Germany), Saint Petersburg Philharmonic Hall (Russia), Wiener Konzerthaus, Victoria Hall (Geneva), Cadogan Hall in London, Konzerthaus Berlin, Teatro Manzoni in Milan, Orchestra Hall, Chicago, Knight Concert Hall, etc.

In addition, Elisso Bolkvadze has performed with number of orchestras, including Qatar Philharmonic Orchestra, Lithuanian National Symphony Orchestra (Lithuania), National Philharmonic of Ukraine, Tiroler Symphonieorchester Innsbruck, Orchestre National de France, Dallas Symphony Orchestra and so on.

In June, 2018 Elisso performed at UNESCO Headquarters on the occasion of the 100th anniversary of the Proclamation of Independence of the Democratic Republic of Georgia.

Elisso Bolkvadze is also the Founder and Artistic Director of Batumi Black Sea Music and Art Festival in Georgia.

Labels
Elisso Bolkvadze has recorded a broad program for piano and orchestra by Ludwig van Beethoven, Pyotr Ilyich Tchaikovsky, Sergei Rachmaninoff, Camille Saint-Saëns and Franz Liszt for the label Sony Classical Records under  the direction of Jansug Kakhidze.

She also recorded a live recital at the Festival Michel Sogny in August 2007 for the Cascavelle label.

In 2015 she recorded a new CD, with Audite label with the piece of Shubert and Prokofiev.

Selected recordings

 Prokofiev, Piano Sonata No.2 / Schubert, Impromptus D 899. Audite, 2015
 Récital au Festival Michel Sogny (Œuvres de Beethoven, Mozart, Ravel & Michel Sogny). Cascavelle, VEL 3129, Distribution Abeille Musique, 2007
 Camille Saint-Saëns, Piano Concerto Nº 2 / Fantasies, Liszt / Rhapsodie, Rachmaninov,Tbillisi Symphony Orchestra, conducted by Jansug Kakhidze. Cascavelle, 2010

Charity
Elisso Bolkvadze is actively engaged in charitable concerts and activities. In 2013, Elisso founded her own charitable music foundation, Lyra, with the mission of inspiring and promoting the young generation of Georgian classical pianists.

In 2013, Elisso Bolkvadze performed a recital concert “Piano for Peace” at [[World Summit of Nobel Peace Laureates
|Nobel Prize World Summit]] in Warsaw, in presence of Sharon Stone.

She gave the series of charity concerts for supporting Georgian children who have suffered from war as well to help individual patients and children affected by cancer.

In March 2017 she participated in a conference organized by United Nations General Assembly in Geneva with Angelina Jolie to honor the memory of Sérgio Vieira de Mello.

References

External links 
 
 Elisso Bolkvadze named UNESCO Artist for Peace
 Elisso Bolkvadze on BBC
 Elisso Bolkvadze on Danish radio station DR P2
 Prokofiev Piano Sonata
 Prokofiev and Schubert
 Elisso Bolkvadze on Musicologie
 Elisso Bolkvadze on Pianobleu
 Elisso Bolkvadze on Deezer
 Elisso Bolkvadze on IMG Artists
 Elisso Bolkvadze on itunes
 Elisso Bolkvadze on May.live

1967 births
Living people
Classical pianists from Georgia (country)
Women pianists from Georgia (country)
Musicians from Tbilisi
Women classical pianists
People from Batumi
21st-century classical pianists
21st-century women pianists